Kuluse is a village in Lääne-Nigula Parish, Lääne County, in western Estonia. Before to the administrative reform of the Estonian municipalities in 2017, the village belonged to the municipality of Martna.

References

Villages in Lääne County